Provencal is a village in Natchitoches Parish, Louisiana, United States. The population was 611 at the 2010 census. It is part of the Natchitoches Micropolitan Statistical Area.

Coushatta businessman and philanthropist Edgar Cason is a former Provencal resident.

Geography
Provencal is located at  (31.654131, -93.200984).

According to the United States Census Bureau, the village has a total area of 2.5 square miles (6.4 km), all land.

Demographics

2020 census

As of the 2020 United States census, there were 528 people, 167 households, and 67 families residing in the village.

2000 census
As of the census of 2000, there were 708 people, 273 households, and 200 families residing in the village. The racial makeup of the village was 97.60% White, 0.42% African American, 1.13% Native American, 0.28% from other races, and 0.56% from two or more races. 1.27% of the population are Hispanic or Latino of any race.

There were 273 households, out of which 40.3% had children under the age of 18 living with them, 61.5% were married couples living together, 10.3% had a female householder with no husband present, and 26.4% were non-families. 25.3% of all households were made up of individuals, and 13.2% had someone living alone who was 65 years of age or older. The average household size was 2.59 and the average family size was 3.12.

In the village, the population was spread out, with 29.9% under the age of 18, 11.3% from 18 to 24, 25.6% from 25 to 44, 20.9% from 45 to 64, and 12.3% who were 65 years of age or older. The median age was 30 years. For every 100 females, there were 87.8 males. For every 100 females age 18 and over, there were 83.7 males.

The median income for a household in the village was $31,196, and the median income for a family was $32,625. Males had a median income of $31,389 versus $19,625 for females. The per capita income for the village was $14,842. About 7.1% of families and 9.3% of the population were below the poverty line, including 10.0% of those under age 18 and 5.9% of those age 65 or over.

References

Villages in Louisiana
Villages in Natchitoches Parish, Louisiana
Populated places in Ark-La-Tex